Michelle Conroy is a member of the Progressive Conservative Party of New Brunswick and an MLA in the Legislative Assembly of New Brunswick representing the riding of Miramichi.

Conroy was re-elected in the 2020 provincial election, defeating the Liberal Party Leader Kevin Vickers by more than 1000 votes.

On March 30, 2022, Conroy announced she will be leaving the People's Alliance of New Brunswick to join the Progressive Conservative Party of New Brunswick.

Prior to her election, she worked in health care administration.

Election results

References

Living people
Canadian healthcare managers
People's Alliance of New Brunswick MLAs
People from Miramichi, New Brunswick
Women MLAs in New Brunswick
21st-century Canadian politicians
21st-century Canadian women politicians
Year of birth missing (living people)